Jean IV de Mauquenchy (died 1391), Lord of Blainville, also known as Mouton de Blainville, was a French soldier and nobleman. He was a Marshal of France during the Hundred Years' War.

Biography
In 1370, with Bertrand du Guesclin, they defeated an English army beneath the walls of the Château de la Faigne and captured the commander Thomas de Grandison.

Citations

References
La Chenaye-Desbois, Dictionnaire de la Noblesse, 1869, Volume 13, page 483.

Year of birth unknown
1391 deaths
14th-century French people
French soldiers
14th-century military history of France
Place of birth missing